Symphodus is a genus of wrasses native to the eastern Atlantic Ocean and the Mediterranean Sea.

Species
The currently recognized species in this genus are:
 Symphodus bailloni (Valenciennes, 1839) (Baillon's wrasse)
 Symphodus caeruleus (Azevedo, 1999)
 Symphodus cinereus (Bonnaterre, 1788) (grey wrasse)
 Symphodus doderleini D. S. Jordan, 1890
 Symphodus mediterraneus (Linnaeus, 1758) (axillary wrasse)
 Symphodus melops (Linnaeus, 1758) (corkwing wrasse) 
 Symphodus ocellatus (Linnaeus, 1758) (ocellated wrasse)
 Symphodus roissali (A. Risso, 1810) (five-spotted wrasse)
 Symphodus rostratus (Bloch, 1791) (pointed-snout wrasse)
 Symphodus tinca (Linnaeus, 1758) (East Atlantic peacock wrasse)
 Symphodus trutta (Lowe 1834) (Emerald wrasse)

References

 
Labridae
Marine fish genera
 
 
 
 
Taxa named by Constantine Samuel Rafinesque